The Ritz Fizz was created as the Ritz-Carlton hotel chain's signature cocktail in 1934 upon the repealing of prohibition in the United States. It was first concocted in the bar at The Ritz-Carlton Hotel in Boston, Massachusetts.

Versions

Ritz Fizz (Boston Ritz Fizz)
In a Champagne Flute glass mix:
 1/2 oz. (12.5 mL) Disaronno Amaretto
 1/2 oz. (12.5 mL) De Kuyper Blue Curacao
 1/2 oz. (12.5 mL) fresh lemon or lime Juice
 Top off with Champagne.
 Stir together.
 Garnish with a rose petal.

Variants
 Some recipes use Sour mix or Sweet & Sour mix instead of the lime or lemon juice.

Le Ritz Fizz (Canadian Ritz Fizz)
The Ritz-Carlton Hotel in Montreal makes their version with 1/2 oz. (12.5 mL) of apple liqueur instead of the Amaretto and Blue Curaçao and garnishes it with a sugar cube dipped in raspberry liqueur. This is probably due to copyright infringement since the Montreal Ritz-Carlton is privately owned and has not been part of the Ritz-Carlton group since the 1970s, which was when the hotelier pulled out of Montreal due to the city's economic decline.

See also

References

Cocktails with Champagne
Cocktails with liqueur
The Ritz-Carlton Hotel Company